Evolution is the second studio album by American heavy metal band Once Human. It was released on February 17, 2017 through earMUSIC. On September 13, 2016, the band released the music video for "Eye of Chaos".

Track listing

References 

2017 albums
Once Human albums
E1 Music albums
Edel AG albums